Sulfite reductase (ferredoxin) (ferredoxin-sulfite reductase) is an enzyme with systematic name hydrogen-sulfide:ferredoxin oxidoreductase. This enzyme catalises the following chemical reaction

 hydrogen sulfide + 6 oxidized ferredoxin + 3 H2O  sulfite + 6 reduced ferredoxin + 6 H+

This sulfite reductase is an iron protein.

References

External links 
 

EC 1.8.7